Barkly is an electoral division of the Legislative Assembly in Australia's Northern Territory. It was first created in 1974, and is named after the Barkly Tableland area, which occupies much of the electorate. Barkly is a rural electorate, covering 442,868 km² and taking in the towns of Tennant Creek, Borroloola, Ali Curung, Warrego, Tara Aboriginal Community and Alpururulam. There were 5,690 people enrolled in the electorate as of August 2020.

Barkly was created along with the creation of the Assembly in 1974 as a conservative-leaning marginal seat centred on the town of Tennant Creek. It was won at that election by Country Liberal Party candidate Ian Tuxworth, who later became a high-profile Cabinet minister and served as Chief Minister from 1984 to 1986. Tuxworth was comfortably re-elected as a CLP member in 1977, 1980 and 1983, but faced an extremely close race in 1987 after he quit the CLP in order to head the rival conservative NT Nationals party. He won a narrow victory over Labor Party candidate Maggie Hickey, but saw the win overturned by the Court of Disputed Returns upon a legal challenge from Hickey before again winning the resulting by-election. A redistribution ahead of the 1990 election made Barkly a notionally Labor seat, and Tuxworth mounted an ultimately unsuccessful bid for Goyder instead. Hickey was comfortably elected in Tuxworth's absence, and went on to serve as Opposition Leader from 1996 to 1999, before retiring due to ill health in 2001. Labor candidate Elliot McAdam was comfortably elected at the 2001 election before going on to serve as a minister in the Martin and Henderson Labor governments. He retired at the 2008 election, in which Labor's Gerry McCarthy was elected as his successor.

Members for Barkly

Election results

References

External links
 Division profile from the Northern Territory Electoral Commission

Barkly